The Alfa Romeo RL was produced between 1922–1927. It was Alfa's first sport model after World War I. The car was designed in 1921 by Giuseppe Merosi. It had a straight-6 engine with overhead valves. Three different versions were made: Normale, Turismo and Sport. RL total production was 2640.

Models
The RLTF (Targa Florio) was the race version of RL. It weighed half of the normal versions, even if the engine had seven main bearings instead of four and double carburetors. It was used among the 1923 Alfa race team, which had drivers like Ugo Sivocci, Antonio Ascari, Giulio Masetti and Enzo Ferrari.  Sivocci's car had green cloverleaf symbol on white background and when he won Targa Florio 1923, that symbol was to become the Alfa team's good luck token. Five different RLSS were entered in the first Mille Miglia in 1927, but only two completed the race.

A 1925 RLSS version with rare, original bodywork by Thornton Engineering Company in Bradford, UK, is on permanent display in the Targa Florio exhibit at the Simeone Foundation Automotive Museum in Philadelphia, PA, USA. It is one of only 9 RLSS still in existence.

Production numbers

References

Notes

Bibliography

 
 

RL
Sports cars
Cars introduced in 1922
Articles containing video clips